Mohammad Reza Khan is a politician and the former Member of Parliament of Jamalpur-5.

Career
Khan was elected to parliament from Jamalpur-5 as a Combined opposition candidate in 1988.

References

Living people
4th Jatiya Sangsad members
Year of birth missing (living people)